YCSS may refer to:

Yacht Club Santo Stefano, a sport club in Porto Santo Stefano, Italy
Yuan Ching Secondary School, a secondary school in Taman Jurong, Singapore